Taha Hassouba (born 1925) was an Egyptian rower. He competed in the men's eight event at the 1960 Summer Olympics.

References

External links
 

1925 births
Possibly living people
Egyptian male rowers
Olympic rowers of Egypt
Rowers at the 1960 Summer Olympics
Place of birth missing
20th-century Egyptian people